Nevosoft is a casual game developer, publisher, distributor, and portal headquartered in St. Petersburg, Russia. Nevosoft was founded in 2002. The company has four development studios situated in St. Petersburg and Moscow, which together deliver downloadable and online entertainment software for various platforms (Microsoft Windows, Mac OS X, iPhone, iPad, iPod Touch, etc.) Nevosoft makes its games available in Russian and English via its official websites. Besides Nevosoft's titles are translated into more than 10 languages and are distributed worldwide through both online and offline channels.

Nevosoft has developed games like My Kingdom for the Princess I & II, Mushroom Age, Mysteryville 1 & 2, Christmasville, Supercow and about 25 more. Nevosoft's titles are distributed in a try before you buy format. They can be played free for the first 60 minutes, with the full version available for a fee.

Game Development
Nevosoft has developed more than 30 games.

Game Distribution
The official website is a Russian portal devoted to casual games with four new titles released each week. Nevosoft.ru, was launched in 2006 and since has become the biggest social network of casual players. It won the Best Website of the Year award in 2010 from the Russian Entertainment Awards.

Nevosoft also has a broad partner network called GameBoss, which enables other websites to sell games from Nevosoft's catalogue and take commission for each game sold.

Innovations

Nevosoft was one of the first developers that used character dialogues to create a plot that linked mini-games and the mechanics of locating hidden objects on the screen. Mysteryville, released in 2006, was one of the first hidden object casual games to utilize an engaging plot and appealing characters.  Mysteryville remained in RealArcade's Top 10 of for 153 days.

In 2006 Nevosoft started selling its content via SMS payments. As of 2009 more than 90% of casual game purchases in Russia are made with the help of SMS payment.

Nevosoft was the first casual game portal that started 24/7 technical support, thus providing the most extensive customer support in Russian in the casual game industry. The company launched a Technical Support Department, equipped with programs developed by Nevosoft.

References

External links
 The Interview with My Kingdom for the Princess 3 Developers
 Nevosoft's official website (in Russian)
 Nevosoft's English distribution website
 Nevosoft’s Julia Lebedeva on creative PR, reviewing games and developers from Mars
What Martians Don’t Know? Mistakes Made by Alien Invaders You can download audio or slides, or watch video online (in Russian)
 Casual Connect Kyiv 2009 (in Russian)

Video game companies established in 2002
Video game companies of Russia
Video game development companies
Casual games
Companies based in Saint Petersburg
2002 establishments in Russia